Scotorythra hecataea is a moth of the family Geometridae. It was first described by Edward Meyrick in 1899. It is endemic to the Hawaiian islands of Kauai and Oahu.

External links

H
Endemic moths of Hawaii
Biota of Kauai
Biota of Oahu